KAVL (610 AM, "Fox Sports 610") is a commercial radio station that is licensed to Lancaster, California and serves the Antelope Valley area. The station is owned by RZ Radio LLC and broadcasts a sports radio format as an affiliate of Fox Sports Radio. KAVL has a directional-east 4900-watt signal during the day and a directional-south 4000-watt signal at night. It is the Los Angeles home of the Rich Eisen Show.

History
KAVL first signed on September 8, 1950 on 1340 kHz. It moved to 610 kHz in 1957. For many years, KAVL broadcast a sports radio format with the branding "Sports Radio 610".

In September 1998, Antelope Broadcasting sold its three stations — KAVL, KAVS, and KYHT — to Jacor Communications for $4 million. Jacor would be purchased by Clear Channel Communications the following year. KAVL then began simulcasting KXTA (XTRA Sports 1150) in Los Angeles. For a brief period, KAVL itself was simulcast on KBET (1220 AM) in Santa Clarita.

In 2007, publicly traded Clear Channel announced it was becoming a privately held corporation. As a condition of its approval of the plan, the Federal Communications Commission (FCC) required the company to divest 194 stations in markets where it exceeded ownership limits by placing them into a trust until they are sold. In January 2008, Clear Channel transferred KAVL and country music station KTPI-FM to the Aloha Stations Trust. In December 2011, RZ Media LLC, owned by Saul Rosenzweig, purchased KAVL and KTPI-FM from the trust, and KTPI (AM) from Clear Channel directly, for a total of $800,000.

Programming

Since the Jacor/Clear Channel merger, KAVL's lineup has consisted almost entirely of Fox Sports Radio programming. The station also features radio broadcasts of the Los Angeles Dodgers, the Los Angeles Lakers, and the National Football League (through Westwood One). KAVL is the longest-running Dodgers affiliate in Southern California, having broadcast the Dodgers since 1958.

References

External links
FCC History Cards for KAVL

AVL
Sports radio stations in the United States
Radio stations established in 1957